Schafer Park, California was an unincorporated suburban community absorbed into Hayward, California, at the same time as the acquisition of Mount Eden. It was named for A.W. Schafer, a German immigrant who purchased land in the area in the 1860s. The family sold its land to a real estate developer in the 1950s. Schafer Park was located between Hayward and Mount Eden.

Notes

External links
history at Schafer Park School website

Neighborhoods in Hayward, California
Former populated places in California